Athrips gussakovskii is a moth of the family Gelechiidae. It is found in Uzbekistan, Mongolia and China (Ningxia).

The wingspan is 11–13.5 mm. The forewings are yellowish white, with a brown tornal spot at three-quarters of the posterior margin and with the veins darker. There are some brown-tipped scales in the subapical area. The hindwings are light grey. Adults are on wing from July to August.

References

Moths described in 1930
Athrips
Moths of Asia